Undaria is a genus of kelp that includes Undaria pinnatifida (wakame).

External links 

Alariaceae
Laminariales genera